Daniel Hearne was an Anglican priest in Ireland during the mid-18th century.

Hearne educated at Trinity College, Dublin. He was Archdeacon of Cashel from 1728 until his death in November 1766.

Notes

Alumni of Trinity College Dublin
Archdeacons of Cashel
18th-century Irish Anglican priests
1766 deaths
Year of birth missing